The 2017 Saint Louis FC season is the franchise's third season in the United Soccer League, one of two leagues in the second division of soccer in the United States.

Due to the addition of new teams to the league, the club returns to the USL's Eastern Conference, where they played during their inaugural 2015 season.

Additionally, the club announced the end of their affiliation with the Chicago Fire of Major League Soccer, which had been in place for their first two seasons.

Current roster
Where a player has not declared an international allegiance, nation is determined by place of birth.

Player movement

Returning players from 2016

New signings

Academy signings

Loans

In

Out

United Soccer League season

Preseason

Results summary

Matches

Standings

Eastern Conference Table

U.S. Open Cup

Matches

References

Saint Louis FC seasons
Saint Louis FC
Saint Louis FC
Saint Louis FC